Anthony Liberatore (born 11 February 1966) is a former Australian rules footballer who represented the  in the Australian Football League (AFL).

Liberatore is the only player to have won league best-and-fairest medals in all three grades of VFL/AFL football (under 19s, reserves and seniors).  Liberatore is one of the shortest players to have played in the VFL/AFL competition and the shortest player to have won a Brownlow Medal.

Playing as a rover, Liberatore was a long-time holder of the VFL/AFL record for most career tackles.

Liberatore was born in Australia to Italian parents.

Playing career

Footscray/Western Bulldogs
Liberatore played junior football for Brunswick City. Mick Malthouse, who was Footscray senior coach at the time, invited Liberatore to train but made no guarantees that he would get a game. At his first training session with the club, Liberatore was teased by full-forward Simon Beasley, who said that due to his lack of height he would have been better off training to be a jockey at the nearby Flemington Racecourse. Although Liberatore made his senior level debut in 1986, he mainly played in the reserves that season, winning the VFL reserves' Gardiner Medal in both 1986 and 1988. He was a member of the team that won the 1988 VFL reserves premiership.

Standing at 163 cm, Liberatore played only 18 senior games until the 1990 season, when he played 19 games and won the Brownlow Medal for the best and fairest senior AFL player.

Liberatore played a total of 283 senior games for Footscray/Western Bulldogs in a career that included 13 finals, life membership of the club, and selection on the interchange bench in the club's Team of the Century.

Liberatore was noted for his ability to read the play and his prolific tackling.  Throughout his senior career, he made 1,225 tackles in his career; an average of 4.39 per game. In 1992 he became the first VFL/AFL player to exceed 100 tackles in a season, and then exceeded 100 tackles each season until 1996.  His season tally of 142 tackles in 1994 stood as the VFL/AFL record until 2006, when James McDonald bettered it by one.

Playing statistics

|- style="background-color: #EAEAEA"
! scope="row" style="text-align:center" | 1986
|style="text-align:center;"|
| 60 || 4 || 1 || 1 || 19 || 22 || 41 || 5 ||  || 0.3 || 0.3 || 4.8 || 5.5 || 10.3 || 1.3 || 
|-
! scope="row" style="text-align:center" | 1987
|style="text-align:center;"|
| 39 || 12 || 7 || 11 || 102 || 70 || 172 || 10 || 23 || 0.6 || 0.9 || 8.5 || 5.8 || 14.3 || 0.8 || 1.9
|- style="background:#eaeaea;"
! scope="row" style="text-align:center" | 1988
|style="text-align:center;"|
| 39 || 1 || 0 || 0 || 4 || 6 || 10 || 1 || 1 || 0.0 || 0.0 || 4.0 || 6.0 || 10.0 || 1.0 || 1.0
|-
! scope="row" style="text-align:center" | 1989
|style="text-align:center;"|
| 39 || 1 || 0 || 0 || 12 || 2 || 14 || 1 || 3 || 0.0 || 0.0 || 12.0 || 2.0 || 14.0 || 1.0 || 3.0
|- style="background:#eaeaea;"
! scope="row" style="text-align:center" | 1990
|style="text-align:center;"|
| 39 || 19 || 13 || 8 || 249 || 245 || 494 || 33 || 82 || 0.7 || 0.4 || 13.1 || 12.9 || 26.0 || 1.7 || 4.3
|-
! scope="row" style="text-align:center" | 1991
|style="text-align:center;"|
| 39 || 22 || 13 || 9 || 301 || 296 || 597 || 29 || 62 || 0.6 || 0.4 || 13.7 || 13.5 || 27.1 || 1.3 || 2.8
|- style="background:#eaeaea;"
! scope="row" style="text-align:center" | 1992
|style="text-align:center;"|
| 39 || 25 || 14 || 4 || 326 || 286 || 612 || 47 || 136 || 0.6 || 0.2 || 13.0 || 11.4 || 24.5 || 1.9 || 5.4
|-
! scope="row" style="text-align:center" | 1993
|style="text-align:center;"|
| 39 || 20 || 12 || 8 || 250 || 238 || 488 || 27 || 115 || 0.6 || 0.4 || 12.5 || 11.9 || 24.4 || 1.4 || 5.8
|-style="background:#eaeaea;"
! scope="row" style="text-align:center" | 1994
|style="text-align:center;"|
| 39 || 24 || 6 || 9 || 280 || 211 || 491 || 26 || 142 || 0.3 || 0.4 || 11.7 || 8.8 || 20.5 || 1.1 || 5.9
|-
! scope="row" style="text-align:center" | 1995
|style="text-align:center;"|
| 39 || 23 || 9 || 6 || 304 || 234 || 538 || 36 || 116 || 0.4 || 0.3 || 13.2 || 10.2 || 23.4 || 1.6 || 5.0
|-style="background:#eaeaea;"
! scope="row" style="text-align:center" | 1996
|style="text-align:center;"|
| 39 || 22 || 6 || 6 || 250 || 232 || 482 || 24 || 111 || 0.3 || 0.3 || 11.4 || 10.5 || 21.9 || 1.1 || 5.0
|-
! scope="row" style="text-align:center" | 1997
|style="text-align:center;"|
| 39 || 24 || 8 || 4 || 237 || 196 || 433 || 40 || 95 || 0.3 || 0.2 || 9.9 || 8.2 || 18.0 || 1.7 || 4.0
|-style="background:#eaeaea;"
! scope="row" style="text-align:center" | 1998
|style="text-align:center;"|
| 39 || 9 || 0 || 3 || 49 || 51 || 100 || 16 || 25 || 0.0 || 0.3 || 5.4 || 5.7 || 11.1 || 1.8 || 2.8
|-
! scope="row" style="text-align:center" | 1999
|style="text-align:center;"|
| 39 || 21 || 2 || 3 || 197 || 154 || 351 || 28 || 69 || 0.1 || 0.1 || 9.4 || 7.3 || 16.7 || 1.3 || 3.3
|-style="background:#eaeaea;"
! scope="row" style="text-align:center" | 2000
|style="text-align:center;"|
| 39 || 23 || 3 || 6 || 204 || 230 || 434 || 56 || 99 || 0.1 || 0.3 || 8.9 || 10.0 || 18.9 || 2.4 || 4.3
|-
! scope="row" style="text-align:center" | 2001
|style="text-align:center;"|
| 39 || 17 || 1 || 3 || 120 || 150 || 270 || 26 || 90 || 0.1 || 0.2 || 7.1 || 8.8 || 15.9 || 1.5 || 5.3
|-style="background:#eaeaea;"
! scope="row" style="text-align:center" | 2002
|style="text-align:center;"|
| 39 || 16 || 0 || 2 || 60 || 90 || 150 || 22 || 56 || 0.0 || 0.1 || 3.8 || 5.6 || 9.4 || 1.4 || 3.5
|- class="sortbottom"
! colspan=3| Career
! 283
! 95
! 83
! 2964
! 2713
! 5677
! 427
! 1225
! 0.3
! 0.3
! 10.5
! 9.6
! 20.1
! 1.5
! 4.4
|}

Honours and achievements

Individual
Brownlow Medal: 1990
Charles Sutton Medal (Footscray F.C. Best & Fairest): 1991
Victorian Representative Honours
Gardiner Medal (VFA/VFL Best & Fairest): 1986, 1988
Morrish Medal: 1984
Footscray F.C. Team of the Century - Interchange
Italian Team of the Century - Interchange

Post-football and coaching career

Early coaching career
Liberatore coached the Box Hill Hawks in the Victorian Football League in 2003, taking them to the Grand Final.

Carlton Football Club assistant coach  (2004-2007)
Between 2004 and 2007, he held an assistant coaching position at  under senior coach Denis Pagan before Pagan was replaced by fellow Carlton assistant coach Brett Ratten as caretaker senior coach with six matches remaining in the 2007 season. However, as part of the changeover, Liberatore then departed the Carlton Football Club at the end of the 2007 season.

Other coaching roles
In 2008, he was the senior coach of the Sunbury Lions Football Club in the Ballarat Football League. In 2009, he became the senior coach of the West Footscray Roosters, a team playing in the Melbourne suburban Western Region Football League.

2008 radio interview controversy
In a radio interview in the 2008 pre-season, Liberatore accused then Bulldogs CEO Campbell Rose of causing dissension at the club and being more concerned with making money than winning football matches. His comments saw him briefly banished from the club until he came to apologize to the president David Smorgon later in the year.

Family
Liberatore married his wife Jane, a schoolteacher, in 1991. Together, they had two sons, Tom and Oliver Liberatore, and a daughter named Meg. News of a divorce between Liberatore and his wife became public in April 2008 when Jane demanded the sale of Liberatore's medals during the legal proceedings, with the intention of using the money to create a trust fund for their children's education.

Liberatore was present at the 2016 AFL Grand Final with his daughter and his mother, and was seen celebrating the Bulldogs' victory with his son Tom after the game.

Footnotes
1. The true number of tackles is likely slightly higher than 1225, as tackle statistics were not recorded during 1986, in which Liberatore played the first four of his 283 games.

References

External links
Western Bulldogs player profile – Tony Liberatore

Brownlow Medal winners
1966 births
Living people
Australian rules footballers from Victoria (Australia)
Western Bulldogs players
Box Hill Football Club coaches
Australian people of Italian descent
Victorian State of Origin players
Charles Sutton Medal winners
Sportspeople of Italian descent